Flameng is a surname. Notable people with the surname include:

François Flameng (1856–1923), French painter
Léon Flameng (1877–1917), French cyclist and pilot
Léopold Flameng (1831–1911), French engraver, illustrator, and painter